Hopea tenuinervula is a tree in the family Dipterocarpaceae, native to Borneo. The specific epithet tenuinervula means "slender nerve", referring to the leaf veins.

Description
The bark is flaky and reddish-brown in patches.

Distribution and habitat
Hopea tenuinervula is endemic to Borneo.

Conservation
Hopea tenuinervula has been assessed as near threatened on the IUCN Red List. It is threatened by logging for its timber and conversion of land for plantations. The species is found in some protected areas.

References

tenuinervula
Endemic flora of Borneo
Plants described in 1967
Taxobox binomials not recognized by IUCN